Bluesine is a solo album by pianist Martial Solal recorded in Milan in 1983 and released on the Soul Note label.

Critical reception 

Ken Dryden of AllMusic said "This solo piano affair by Martial Solal dates from early 1983, mixing striking interpretations of standards and familiar jazz compositions along with his own stunning originals".

Track listing 
All compositions by Martial Solal except where noted.
 "The End of a Love Affair" (Edward C. Redding) – 5:11
 "Bluesine" – 2:55
 "Lover" (Richard Rodgers, Lorenz Hart) – 3:54
 "I'll Remember April" (Gene de Paul, Patricia Johnston, Don Raye) – 5:40
 "Moins de 36" – 2:47
 "'Round About Midnight" (Thelonious Monk, Cootie Williams) – 6:00
 "Yardbird Suite" (Charlie Parker) – 3:02
 "14 Septembre" – 4:00
 "Have You Met Miss Jones?" (Rogers, Hart) – 3:40

Personnel 
Martial Solal – piano

References 

Martial Solal albums
1983 albums
Black Saint/Soul Note albums
Solo piano jazz albums